Recurvaria ochrospila is a moth of the family Gelechiidae. It is found in India.

The larvae feed between appressed leaves of Ougeinia dalbergioides.

References

Moths described in 1934
Recurvaria
Moths of Asia